Gasimushaghi carpets are Azerbaijani pile carpets of the Karabakh school of the Jabrayil group.

Carpets
The name of this carpet is related to the Şamkənd, Ərikli, Kürdhacı, Chorman and Shalva villages of the Lachin Rayon of Azerbaijan.

Gasimushaghi carpets are broadly spread in carpet weaving points of the “Carpet weaving schools of Karabakh”. Earlier it was woven in a village called Gasimushaghi obasi and its production also developed in this village and especially in Şamkənd, Ərikli, Kürdhacı, Chorman and Shalva villages. Development in production of these carpets in these villages based on rich raw materials and ancient history of handicraft traditions. Gasimushaghi obasi village provided its residents with special raw materials such as wool and natural colors made of plants. These carpets are also unique and are still saved in several museums of the world.

The medallion-carpets of Karabakh such as “Darya-nur”, “Khanlig”, “Karabakh”, “Chelebi”, “Malibeyli” and “Gasimushaghi” make up a peculiar group of Karabakh carpets.

Some centuries ago, ornaments of the “Gasimushaghi carpets” were used in embroidery and called “Gasimushaghi embroideries”. Then these embroidery ornaments were used in Gasimushaghi carpets and that is why these carpets are also called “Embroidery carpets”.

Artistic analysis

Masterly made arrangement of ornamentations of the whole composition of the central part of Gasimushaghi carpets arouse interest. No part of the background of the middle and external area of the carpet stayed unused.

Traditionally, long-staple wool, called “yapaghi” was used in weaving of Gasimushaghi carpets. Generally, seven natural colors such as white, black, deep red, deep blue, green, yellow and brown are used in the weaving of these carpets. Gasimushaghi carpets have deep red background with deep blue middle area.

There is a large medallion consisted of various figures, details and elements in the center of the carpet. Upper and lower corners of Gasimushaghi carpets are woven from white wool and are S-shaped (“gol”). S-shaped corners are peculiar for Gasimushaghi carpets and there is an appearance of a dragon in these S-shaped corners. Sometimes these carpets are called “Aggol khalcha” (Carpet with white hands) by local population. All other ornaments are woven with a hook and it is believed that these ornaments defend people from evil spirits.

Structure and technical features

Like other carpets of Karabakh’s carpet weaving school such as “Khanlig”, “Bahmanli”, “Garagoyunlu” and “Talish”, Gasimushaghi carpets also are dense, with high level of knots, soft and light. Turkbaf knot is considered the basis of Gasimushaghi carpets.

Dimensions of Gasimushagi carpets are generally, from 200x120 to 230x160, but sometimes they can be larger. Density of knots varies from 30x30 to 40x40 (from 90000 to 160000 knots in a sq.meter). Height of the wool is 7–10 mm.

In popular culture
In 2007, an exhibition of Caucasian carpets was held in Prague. Some Czech representatives became familiar with some Azerbaijani carpets of Karabakh School and after a while the Czech Republic released postal stamps with the picture of Gasimushaghi carpets with an inscription saying “Karabakh carpets in the 19th century”.

References

Azerbaijani rugs and carpets
Embroidery